The Nebraska State Historical Society Building is a historic two-story building in Lincoln, Nebraska. It was built by Olson Construction in 1953 to house the Nebraska State Historical Society, founded in 1878. It was designed in the Moderne style by architect Ellery Lothrop Davis. According to the National Register of Historic Places form, "The almost harsh horizontal, rectangular configuration of the Building coupled with its stark coloring and lack of ornamentation may be seen to shadow elements of the Bauhaus and International styles, which in turn had borrowed from the Prairie style." It has been listed on the National Register of Historic Places since August 21, 2003.

References

	
National Register of Historic Places in Lincoln, Nebraska
Buildings and structures completed in 1953
1953 establishments in Nebraska
History Nebraska